Guaqui is a railhead and port in Bolivia on Lake Titicaca.  A ferry (a car float) connects with the Peruvian railhead and port on Puno. It served as location of Inca ruins prior to the arrival of the Spanish. The towns current church sites on what was the ancient ruins.

Elevation 

Transportation

Roads 
The RN-1 is a major road that runs through Guaqui with connections to neighboring Peru.

Rail 

The railways on the Bolivian side are  gauge, while the railways on the Peruvian side are  gauge. Cars are transported over water by car float Manco Capac owned by PeruRail.

Water 

Guaqui is also home/port to Bolivian Navy flotilla.

Air 

The closest airport to Guaqui is El Alto International Airport to the east.

See also 

 Transport in Bolivia
 Transport in Peru

References 

Populated places in La Paz Department (Bolivia)
Rail transport in Peru